This is a  List of leaders of dependent territories in 2013

Argentina

  (claimed territory)
 Administered by the Governor of Tierra del Fuego, Antarctica, and the Islands of the South Atlantic Province of Argentina
 Argentinian Antarctic claim has not been recognized by the United Nations, US, Russia, or by most other countries.
See also: Antarctic Treaty.

Australia

  (uninhabited territory)
 Administered by the Australian Minister for Regional Australia, Regional Development and Local Government to 25 March, by Minister for Regional Development and Local Government to 1 July, by Australian Minister for Regional Australia, Regional Development and Local Government to 18 September and by Australian Ministry of Infrastructure and Regional Development
   Australian Antarctic Territory (territory)
 Administered by the Australian Antarctic Division of the Ministry of Sustainable Population, Communities, Environment and Water to 18 September 2013 and then of the Ministry of Environment
 Australian Antarctic claim has not been recognized by the United Nations, US, Russia, or by most other countries.
See also: Antarctic Treaty.
  (territory)
 Administrator – Jon Stanhope, Administrator of Christmas Island (2012–2014)
President of Shire –
Foo Kee Heng, President of the Christmas Island Shire Council (2011–2013)
Gordon Thomson, President of the Christmas Island Shire Council (2013–present)  
  (territory)
 Administrator – Jon Stanhope, Administrator of Christmas Island (2012–2014)
 President of the Shire Council – Aindil Minkom (2011–2015)
   Coral Sea Islands (uninhabited territory)
 Administered by Australian Minister for Regional Australia, Regional Development and Local Government to 25 March, by Minister for Regional Development and Local Government to 1 July, by Australian Minister for Regional Australia, Regional Development and Local Government to 18 September and by Australian Ministry of Infrastructure and Regional Development
  Heard Island and McDonald Islands (uninhabited territory)
 Administered by the Australian Antarctic Division of the Ministry of Sustainable Population, Communities, Environment and Water to 18 September 2013 and then of the Ministry of Environment
  (unincorporated, self-governed, area of New South Wales)
 Chairman of the Lord Howe Island Board
Bob Conroy, Chairman of the Lord Howe Island Board (2012–2013)
Chris Eccles, Chairman of the Lord Howe Island Board (2013–2014)   
  Macquarie Island (uninhabited territory of Tasmania)
 Administered by the Park and Wildlife Service of Tasmanian Ministry for Environment, Parks and Heritage
  (territory)
 Administrator – Neil Pope, Administrator of Norfolk Island (2012–2014)
 Chief Minister
David Ernest Buffett, Chief Minister of Norfolk Island (2010–2013)
Lisle Snell, Chief Minister of Norfolk Island (2013–2015) 
 Torres Strait Islands (territory with a special status fitting the native land rights)
 Chairperson of the Torres Strait Regional Authority – Joseph Elu (2012–2016)

Brazil

   Brazilian Antarctica (claimed territory)
 Chairman of Brazilian National Commission on Antarctic Matters (Minister of External Relations of Brazil) 
 Antonio Patriota Chairman of Brazilian National Commission on Antarctic Matters (2011–2013)
 Luiz Alberto Figueiredo Chairman of Brazilian National Commission on Antarctic Matters (2013–2014)  
 Brazilian Antarctic claim has not been recognized by the United Nations, US, Russia, or by most other countries.
See also: Antarctic Treaty.

Chile

  (claimed territory)
 Governor of Antártica Chilena Province – Nelson Cárcamo Barrera (2010–2014)
 Chilean Antarctic claim has not been recognised by the United Nations, US, Russia, or by most other countries.
See also: Antarctic Treaty.
  (territory)
 Governor of Easter Island Province – Carmen Cardinali Paoa (2010–2014)
 Mayor – Pedro Edmuns Paoa – (2012–present)

People's Republic of China (PRC)

  (special administrative region)
 Chief Executive – Leung Chun-ying, Chief Executive of Hong Kong (2012–2017)
  (special administrative region)
 Chief Executive – Fernando Chui, Chief Executive of Macao (2009–2019)

Denmark

  (autonomous territory)
 High Commissioner – Dan Michael Knudsen, High Commissioner of the Faroe Islands (2008–present)
 Prime Minister – Kaj Leo Johannesen, Prime Minister of the Faroe Islands (2008–2015)
  (autonomous territory)
 High Commissioner – Mikaela Engell, High Commissioner of Greenland (2011–present)
 Prime Minister
Kuupik Kleist, Prime Minister of Greenland (2009–2013)
Aleqa Hammond, Prime Minister of Greenland (2013–2014)

Ecuador
  (province)
 Governor – Jorge Alfredo Torres Pallo (2008–2015)
 Chairman of the Governing Council with Special Regime
 Jorge Alfredo Torres Pallo, Chairman of the Governing Council with Special Regime of Galapagos Island (2011–2013)
 María Isabel Salvador, Chairman of the Governing Council with Special Regime of Galapagos Island (2013–2015)

Finland
  (autonomous region)
 Governor – Peter Lindbäck, Governor of Åland Islands (1999–present)
 Premier – Camilla Gunell, Premier of Åland Islands (2011–2015)

France

  Bassas da India (uninhabited territory)
 Administered by the administrator of French Southern and Antarctic Lands
  Clipperton Island (uninhabited territory)
 Administered by French minister of Overseas France through the high commissioner of the Republic in French Polynesia
   Europa Island (uninhabited territory)
 Administered by the administrator of French Southern and Antarctic Lands
  (Guyane) (overseas  and region)
 Prefect
Denis Labbé, Prefect of French Guiana (2011–2013)
Éric Spitz, Prefect of French Guiana (2013–2016) 
 President of the Regional Council – Alain Tien-Liong, President of the Regional Council of Guyane (2011–2015)
 President of the General Council – Rodolphe Alexandre, President of the General Council of Guyane (2010–2015)
  (overseas country)
 High Commissioner
Jean-Pierre Laflaquière, High Commissioner of French Polynesia (2012–2013)
Gilles Cantal, Acting High Commissioner of French Polynesia (2013) 
Lionel Beffre, High Commissioner of French Polynesia (2013–2016) 
 President
Oscar Temaru, President of French Polynesia (2011–2013)
Gaston Flosse, President of French Polynesia (2013–2014) 
  (overseas territory)
 Administrator-Superior – Pascal Bolot, Administrator-Superior of French Southern and Antarctic Lands (2012–2014)
 French Antarctic claim (Adélie Land) has not been recognised by the United Nations, US, Russia, or by most other countries.
See also: Antarctic Treaty.
   Glorioso Islands (uninhabited territory)
 Administered by the administrator of French Southern and Antarctic Lands
  (overseas  and region)
 Prefect
Amaury de Saint Quentin, Prefect of Guadeloupe (2011–2013)
Marcelle Pierrot, Prefect of Guadeloupe (2013–2014)  
 President of the Regional Council – Josette Borel-Lincertin, President of the Regional Council of Guadeloupe (2012–2015)
 President of the General Council – Jacques Gillot, President of the General Council of Guadeloupe (2001–2015)
  Juan de Nova (uninhabited territory)
 Administered by the administrator of French Southern and Antarctic Lands
  (overseas  and region)
 Prefect - Laurent Prévost, Prefect of Martinique (2011–2014)
 President of the Regional Council – Serge Letchimy, President of the Regional Council of Martinique (2010–2015)
 President of the General Council – Josette Manin, President of the General Council of Martinique (2011–2015)
  (overseas  and region)
 Prefect
Thomas Degos, Prefect of Mayotte (2011–2013)
François Chauvin, Acting Prefect of Mayotte (2013)   
Jacques Witkowski, Prefect of Mayotte (2013–2014) 
 President of the General Council – Daniel Zaïdani, President of the General Council of Mayotte (2011–2015)
  (overseas country)
 High Commissioner
Albert Dupuy, High Commissioner of New Caledonia (2010–2013)
Jean-Jacques Brot, High Commissioner of New Caledonia (2013–2014) 
 President of the Government – Harold Martin, President of the Government of New Caledonia (2011–2014)
  Réunion (overseas  and region)
 Prefect – Jean-Luc Marx, Prefect of Réunion (2012-2014)
 President of the Regional Council – Didier Robert, President of the Regional Council of Réunion (2010–2021)
 President of the General Council – Nassimah Dindar, President of the General Council of Réunion (2004–2015)
  (Territorial collectivity)
 Prefect – The prefect of Guadeloupe is also state representative in Saint-Barthélemy from 9 July 2007.
 Prefect delegated – Phillipe Chopin, Prefect delegated of Saint-Barthélemy and Saint-Martin (2011 – 2015)
 President of the Territorial Council – Bruno Magras, President of the Territoria Council of Saint-Barthélemy (2007–present)
   Saint-Martin (Territorial collectivity)
 Prefect – The prefect of Guadeloupe is also state representative in Saint-Martin from 9 July 2007.
 Prefect delegated – Phillipe Chopin, Prefect delegated of Saint-Barthélemy and Saint-Martin (2011 – 2015)
 President of the Territorial Council
Alain Richardson, President of the Territoria Council of Saint-Martin (2012–2013)
Aline Hanson, President of the Territoria Council of Saint-Martin (2013–2017)
  (overseas collectivity)
 Prefect – Patrice Latron, Prefect of Saint-Pierre and Miquelon (2011–2014)
 President of the General Council – Stéphane Artano, President of the General Council of Saint-Pierre and Miquelon (2006–2017)
   Tromelin (uninhabited territory)
 Administered by the administrator of French Southern and Antarctic Lands
  (overseas collectivity)
 Administrator-Superior
Michel Jeanjean, Administrator-Superior of Wallis and Futuna (2010–2013)
Michel Aubouin, Administrator-Superior of Wallis and Futuna (2013–2015) 
 President of the Territorial Assembly
Sosefo Suve, President of the Territorial Assembly of Wallis and Futuna (2012–2013)
Nivaleta Iloai, President of the Territorial Assembly of Wallis and Futuna (2013)   
Petelo Hanisi, President of the Territorial Assembly of Wallis and Futuna (2013–2014) 
  Alo   (Chiefdom of Wallis and Futuna) 
 King – vacant King of Alofi (2010–2014)
  Wallis  (chiefdom of Wallis and Futuna)) 
 King – Polikalepo Kolivai, King of Sigave (2010–2014)
 Wallis (Chiefdom of Wallis and Futuna)
 King – Kapiliele Faupala, King of Wallis (2008–2014)

Netherlands

  (autonomous territory)
 Governor – Fredis Refunjol, Governor of Aruba (2004–2016)
 Prime Minister – Mike Eman, Prime Minister of Aruba (2009–2017)
  (special municipality)
 Lieutenant Governor – Lydia Emerencia, Lieutenant Governor of Bonaire (2012–2014)
  (autonomous territory)
 Governor 
Adèle van der Pluijm-Vrede, Acting Governor of Curaçao (2012–2013)
Lucille George-Wout, Governor of Curaçao (2013–present) 
 Prime Minister
Daniel Hodge, Prime Minister of Curaçao (2012–2013)
Ivar Asjes, Prime Minister of Curaçao (2013–2015) 
  (special municipality)
 Lieutenant Governor – Jonathan G. A. Johnson, Lieutenant Governor of Saba (2008–present)
  (special municipality)
 Lieutenant Governor – Gerald Berkel, Lieutenant Governor of Sint Eustatius (2010–2016)
  (autonomous territory)
 Governor – Eugene Holiday, Governor of Sint Maarten (2010–present)
 Prime Minister – Sarah Wescot-Williams, Prime Minister of Sint Maarten (2010–2014)

New Zealand

  (self-governing territory)
 High Commissioner
John McGregor Carter, High Commissioner of the Cook Islands (2011–2013)
Joanna Kempkers, High Commissioner of the Cook Islands (2013–2014)
 Queen's Representative
Sir Fred Goodwin, Queen's Representative of the Cook Islands (2001–2013)
Tom Marsters, Queen's Representative of the Cook Islands (2013–present) 
 Prime Minister – Henry Puna, Prime Minister of the Cook Islands (2010–2020)
  (associated state)
 High Commissioner – Mark Blumsky, High Commissioner of Niue (2011–2014)
 Premier – Toke Talagi, Premier of Niue (2008–2020)
  Ross Dependency (New Zealand Antarctic Territory)  (territory)
 Administered by the New Zealand Antarctic Division
 New Zeelnand Antarctic claim has not been recognised by the United Nations, US, Russia, or by most other countries.
See also: Antarctic Treaty
  (territory)
 Administrator – Jonathan Kings, Administrator of Tokelau (2011–2015)
Head of Government
Kerisiano Kalolo, Head of Government of Tokelau (2012–2013)
Salesio Lui, Head of Government of Tokelau (2013–2014)

Norway

   Bouvet Island (territory)
 Administered by the Polar Department of the Ministry of Justice and Public Security from Oslo
  Jan Mayen (territory)
 Administered by Governor of Nordland county of Norway
  Peter I Island (territory)
 Administered by the Polar Department of the Ministry of Justice and Public Security from Oslo
  Queen Maud Land (territory)
 Administered by the Polar Department of the Ministry of Justice and Public Security from Oslo
 Norwegian Antarctic claim has not been recognized by the United Nations, US, Russia, or by most other countries.
See also: Antarctic Treaty.
  Svalbard (territory)
 Governor – Odd Olsen Ingerø, Governor of Svalbard (2009–2015)

Portugal

  (autonomous region)
 Representative of the (Portuguese) Republic – Pedro Manuel dos Reis Alves Catarino, (2011–present)
 President of the Government – Vasco Cordeiro, President of the Government of the Azores (2012–2020)
  (autonomous region)
 Representative of the (Portuguese) Republic – Irineu Cabral Barreto, (2011–present)
 President of the Government – Alberto João Jardim, President of the Government of the Madeira (1978–2015)

Spain

  Alborán Island (uninhabited territory)
 Administered by Ayuntamiento de Almería the Comarca of Almería of Spain
  Peñón de Alhucemas (uninhabited territory)
 Administered by Spanish Government
  (autonomous community)
 Government Delegate – María del Carmen Hernández Bento (2011–2015)
 President – Paulino Rivero, President of the Canary Islands (2007–2015)
  (autonomous city)
 Government Delegate – Francisco Antonio González Pérez (2011–2015)
 Mayor-President – Juan Jesús Vivas Lara (2001–present)
  Chafarinas Islands (uninhabited territory)
 Administered by Spanish Government
  (autonomous city)
 Government Delegate – Abdelmalik El Barkani Abdelkader (2011–2018)
 Mayor-President – Juan José Imbroda (2000–2019)
  Peñón de Vélez de la Gomera (uninhabited territory)
 Administered by Spanish Government

South Africa

  Prince Edward Islands (uninhabited territory)
 Administered by Director of Antarctica and Islands of South African Ministry of Water and Environmental Affairs and, since 1 July 2013, by of Director of Southern Ocean and Antarctic Support of the South African ministry for Branch of Oceans and Coasts of the Department of Environmental Affairs

United Kingdom / British Crown

  Akrotiri and Dhekelia (overseas territory)
 Administrator
Graham E. Stacey, Administrator of Akrotiri and Dhekelia (2010–2013)
Richard J. Cripwell, Administrator of Akrotiri and Dhekelia (2013–2015) 
  (overseas territory)
 Governor 
Alistair Harrison, Governor of Anguilla (2009–2013)
Christina Scott, Governor of Anguilla (2013–2017) 
 Chief Minister – Hubert Hughes, Chief Minister of Anguilla (2010–2015)
  (overseas territory)
 Governor – George Fergusson, Governor of Bermuda (2012–2016)
 Premier – Craig Cannonier, Premier of Bermuda (2012–2014)
  (overseas territory)
 Commissioner – Peter Hayes, Commissioner of the British Antarctic Territory (2012–2016)
 Administrator – Henry Burgess , Administrator of the British Antarctic Territory (2011–2016)
 British Antarctic claim has not been recognized by the United Nations, US, Russia, or by most other countries.
See also: Antarctic Treaty.
  (Chagos Islands) (overseas territory)
 Commissioner – Peter Hayes, Commissioner of the British Indian Ocean Territory (2012–2016)
 Administrator
John McManus , Administrator of British Indian Ocean Territory (2011–2013)
Tom Moody , Administrator of British Indian Ocean Territory (2013–2016) 
  (overseas territory)
 Governor – William Boyd McCleary, Governor of the British Virgin Islands (2010–2014)
 Premier – Orlando Smith, Premier of the British Virgin Islands (2011–2019)
  (overseas territory)
 Governor 
Duncan Taylor, Governor of the Cayman Islands (2010–2013)
Franz Manderson, Acting Governor of the Cayman Islands (2013)  
Helen Kilpatrick, Governor of the Cayman Islands (2013–present) 
 Premier
 Juliana O'Connor-Connolly, Premier of the Cayman Islands (2012–2013)
 Alden McLaughlin, Premier of the Cayman Islands (2013–2021) 
  (overseas territory)
 Governor – Nigel Haywood, Governor of the Falkland Islands (2010–2014)
Chief Executive – Keith Padgett, Chief Executive of the Falkland Islands (2012–2016)
  (overseas territory)
 Governor
Sir Adrian Johns, Governor of Gibraltar (2009–2013)
Alison MacMillan, Acting Governor of Gibraltar (2013) 
Sir James Dutton, Governor of Gibraltar (2013–2015) 
 Chief Minister – Fabian Picardo, Chief Minister of Gibraltar (2011–present)
  (crown dependency)
 Monarch – Elizabeth II, Duke of Normandy (1952–present)
 Lieutenant-Governor – Peter Walker, Lieutenant-Governor of Guernsey (2011–2015)
 Bailiff – Richard Collas, Bailiff of Guernsey (2012–2020)
 Chief minister – Peter Harwood, Chief Minister of Guernsey (2012–2014)
  (self-governing island)
 Head of Government – Stuart Trought, President of the States of Alderney (2011 – 2019)
  (self-governing island)
 Seigneur – John Michael Beaumont, Seigneur of Sark (1974 – 2016)
  (crown dependency)
 Monarch – Elizabeth II, Duke of Normandy (1952–present)
 Lieutenant-Governor – Sir John McColl, Lieutenant-Governor of Jersey (2011–2016)
 Bailiff – Michael Birt, Bailiff of Jersey (2009–2015)
 Chief Minister – Ian Gorst, Chief Minister of Jersey (2011–2018)
  (crown dependency)
 Monarch – Elizabeth II, Lord of Mann (1952–present)
 Lieutenant-Governor – Adam Wood, Lieutenant-Governor of Man (2011–2016)
 Chief minister – Allan Bell, Chief Minister of the Isle of Man (2011–2016)
  (overseas territory)
 Governor – Adrian Davis, Governor of Montserrat (2011–2015)
 Chief Minister – Reuben Meade, Chief Minister of Montserrat (2009–2016)
  (overseas territory)
 Governor – Victoria Treadell, Governor of the Pitcairn Islands (2010–2014)
 Mayor – Mike Warren, Mayor of the Pitcairn Islands (2007–2013)
  Saint Helena and Dependencies (overseas territory)
 Governor – Mark Andrew Capes, Governor of Saint Helena (2011–2016)
  (Dependency of Saint Helena)
 Administrator – Colin Wells, Administrator of Ascension Island (2011–2014)
  (Dependency of Saint Helena)
Administrator
Sean Burns, Administrator of Tristan da Cunha (2010–2013)
Alex Mitham, Administrator of Tristan da Cunha (2013–2016) 
  (overseas territory)
 Administrated by the Governor of the Falkland Islands
  (overseas territory)
 Governor
Ric Todd, Governor of the Turks and Caicos Islands (2011–2013)
Anya Williams, Acting Governor of the Turks and Caicos Islands (2013) 
Huw O. Shepheard, Acting Governor of the Turks and Caicos Islands (2013) 
Peter Beckingham, Governor of the Turks and Caicos Islands (2013–2016) ) 
 Premier – Rufus Ewing, Premier of the Turks and Caicos Islands (2012–2016)

United States
  (unincorporated territory)
 Governor
Togiola Tulafono, Governor of American Samoa (2003–2013)
Lolo Matalasi Moliga, Governor of American Samoa (2013–2021) 
 Baker Island (unincorporated territory)
 Administrated by US Department of the Interior
  (unincorporated territory)
 Governor – Eddie Calvo, Governor of Guam (2011–2019)
 Guantanamo Bay Naval Base ( rented naval station)
 Commander – capt. John R. Nettleton, Commander of Guantanamo Bay Naval Station (2012–2015)
  Howland Island (unincorporated territory)
 Administered by US Department of the Interior
  Jarvis Island (unincorporated territory)
 Administered by US Department of the Interior
  Johnston Atoll (unincorporated territory)
 Administered by US Department of the Interior
  Kingman Reef (unincorporated territory)
 Administered by US Department of the Interior
  Midway Islands (unincorporated territory)
 Administered by US Department of the Interior
  Navassa Island (unincorporated territory)
 Administered by US Department of the Interior
  (commonwealth)
 Governor
Benigno Fitial, Governor of the Northern Mariana Islands (2006–2013)
Eloy Inos, Governor of the Northern Mariana Islands (2013–2015) 
  Palmyra Atoll (incorporated territory)
 Administered by US Department of the Interior
  (commonwealth)
 Governor
Luis Fortuño, Governor of Puerto Rico (2009–2013)
Alejandro García Padilla, Governor of Puerto Rico (2013–2017) 
  (unincorporated territory)
 Governor – John de Jongh, Governor of the US Virgin Islands (2007–2015)
  (unincorporated territory)
 Administered by US Department of the Interior

Others

  (territory with international status under the regulations of Antarctic Treaty, signed by 50 states, uninhabited territory)
 Executive Secretary – Manfred Reinke (Germany), Executive Secretary of Antarctic Treaty Secretariat (2009–2017)
 Marie Byrd Land
 Unclaimed territory in Antarctica 
 Paracel Islands
 Occupied by the People's Republic of China; claimed by Vietnam and the Republic of China (Taiwan)
 Spratly Islands
 Claimed in their entirety by the People's Republic of China, the Republic of China (Taiwan), and Vietnam; portions claimed by Malaysia and the Philippines; about 45 islands are occupied by relatively small numbers of military forces from the People's Republic of China, Malaysia, the Philippines, the Republic of China (Taiwan), and Vietnam; Brunei has established a fishing zone that overlaps a southern reef, but has not made any formal claim

See also
List of current dependent territory leaders

References

External links 
Rulersa list of rulers throughout time and places
WorldStatesmenan online encyclopedia of the leaders of nations and territories

Dependent territories
Lists of governors and heads of sub-national entities